The Isam White House is a house located in northwest Portland, Oregon, United States. The house was listed on the National Register of Historic Places in 1991.

See also
National Register of Historic Places listings in Northwest Portland, Oregon

Notes

References

External links

1904 establishments in Oregon
Colonial Revival architecture in Oregon
Houses completed in 1904
Houses on the National Register of Historic Places in Portland, Oregon
Individually listed contributing properties to historic districts on the National Register in Oregon
Northwest Portland, Oregon
Portland Historic Landmarks